Seven ships of the Royal Navy have borne the name HMS Vestal, a term pertaining to the goddess Vesta in Roman mythology:

  was a 32-gun fifth rate launched in 1757 and broken up in 1775.
  was a 20-gun sixth rate launched in 1777, but that foundered later that year.
  was a 28-gun sixth rate launched in 1779. She became a troopship in 1800, was lent to Trinity House in 1803 and was sold in 1816.
 HMS Vestal (1809) – see HCS Vestal below
  was a 26-gun sixth rate launched in 1833 and broken up by 1862.
  was an  wooden screw sloop launched in 1865 and sold in 1884.
  was a  launched in 1900 and sold in 1921.
  was an  launched in 1943 and sunk by Japanese aircraft in 1945.

See also
  – a 14-gun brig of the British East India Company's naval arm, launched at Bombay Dockyard in 1809 and condemned in 1824 during the First Anglo-Burmese War
 

Royal Navy ship names